Jonbaz (also Romanized as Jonbaz̄) is a village in Beyhaq Rural District, Sheshtomad District, Sabzevar County, Razavi Khorasan Province, Iran. At the 2006 census, its population was 372, in 98 families.

References 

Populated places in Sabzevar County